{{Infobox person
| name               = Mugdha Chaphekar
| image              = Mugdha Chapekar at Mumbai Cyclothon.jpg
| caption            = Mugdha Chapekar at Mumbai Cyclothon 2011
| birth_date         = 
| birth_place        = Mumbai,  Maharashtra, India
| occupation         = Actress
| years_active       = 1995; 2001; 2006–present
| known_for          = Kumkum Bhagya}}
Mugdha Chaphekar  is an Indian television and film actress who predominantly works in Hindi-language television shows along with some Marathi-language TV shows and films. Chaphekar made her television debut as an adult artist with Kya Mujhse Dosti Karoge in 2006 but gained attention as Princess Sanyogita in the Star Plus serial Dharti Ka Veer Yodha Prithviraj Chauhan. She was also seen in The Silence. Currently, she is seen in Zee TV’s show Kumkum Bhagya where she is popularly known for her portrayal of Prachi Arora. 

 Career 
Mugdha Chaphekar first appeared as a child artist in the  Bollywood movie Aazmayish. Later in 2001, she appeared in the television series Junior G as Shelly. Chaphekar made her television debut as an adult artist with the show Kya Mujhse Dosti Karoge in 2006.

Chaphekar had her first lead role in Star Plus's epic historical series Dharti Ka Veer Yodha Prithviraj Chauhan where she played Princess Sanyogita. This was followed by roles in Dharam Veer and Mere Ghar Aayi Ek Nanhi Pari.

In 2009, she joined Sab TV's comedy drama show Sajan Re Jhoot Mat Bolo as Aarti Jhaveri. The show enjoyed quite long run of two and half years and ended in 2011. She also worked in the show's spinn off Golmaal Hai Bhai Sab Golmaal Hai as Dhwani

In mid 2014, she joined Zee TV's daily soap opera Satrangi Sasural as Aarushi opposite Ravish Desai whom she later married in December 2016. Her role ended in September 2015. She also appeared in the short film Sumati in 2019.

She made her debut in Marathi television with the show Gulmohar as Kalindi in 2018.

Since March 2019, Chaphekar is seen as Prachi Arora in Zee's Kumkum Bhagya'' opposite Krishna Kaul.

Filmography

Films

Television

See also
List of Indian television actresses
List of Indian film actresses
List of Hindi television actresses

References

External links

 
 

Living people
21st-century Indian actresses
Actresses from Mumbai
Actresses in Hindi television
Indian soap opera actresses
Year of birth missing (living people)